Baisha ( unless otherwise noted) may refer to:

 Baisha, Penghu, a rural township in Penghu County (the Pescadores), Taiwan

People's Republic of China

Subdistricts
 Baisha Subdistrict, Sanming, in Sanyuan District, Sanming, Fujian
 Baisha Subdistrict, Jiangmen, in Pengjiang District, Jiangmen, Guangdong
 Baisha Subdistrict, Yangjiang, in Jiangcheng District, Yangjiang, Guangdong
 Baisha Subdistrict, Haikou, in Meilan District, Haikou, Hainan
 Baisha Subdistrict, Ningbo, in Jiangbei District, Ningbo, Zhejiang

Towns
 Baisha, Jiangjin District, in Jiangjin District, Chongqing
 Baisha, Nanchuan District, in Nanchuan District, Chongqing
 Baisha, Minhou County, in Minhou County, Fujian
 Baisha, Putian, in Putian, Fujian
 Baisha, Shanghang County (白砂), in Shanghang County, Longyan, Fujian
 Baisha, Xinluo District, in Xinluo District, Longyan, Fujian
 Baisha, Gansu, in Qingshui County, Gansu
 Baisha, Leizhou, in Leizhou, Guangdong
 Baisha, Taishan, in Taishan, Guangdong
 Baisha, Yingde, in Yingde, Guangdong
 Baisha, Fuchuan County, in Fuchuan Yao Autonomous County, Guangxi
 Baisha, Guiping, in Guiping, Guangxi
 Baisha, Hepu County, in Hepu County, Guangxi
 Baisha, Liuzhou, in Liuzhou, Guangxi
 Baisha, Yangshuo County, in Yangshuo County, Guangxi
 Baisha, Shiqian County, in Shiqian County, Guizhou
 Baisha, Luoyang, in Yichuan County, Henan
 Baisha, Zhongmu County, in Zhongmu County, Henan
 Baisha, Xiaochang County, in Xiaochang County, Hubei
 Baisha, Huangshi, in Yangxin County, Hubei
 Baisha, Hunan, in Changning, Hunan
 Baisha, Jiangxi, in Jishui County, Jiangxi
 Baisha, Chengdu, in Chengdu, Sichuan
 Baisha, Hejiang County, in Hejiang County, Sichuan
 Baisha, Wanyuan, in Wanyuan, Sichuan
 Baisha, Yunnan, in Yulong Naxi Autonomous County, Yunnan

Other uses in People's Republic of China
 Baisha Li Autonomous County, an autonomous county in Hainan 
 Baisha Township, Guizhou, a township in Pu'an County, Guizhou
 Baisha Lake, a lake and scenic spot in Altay Prefecture, Xinjiang